Jonesboro Airport  is a city-owned public-use airport located three nautical miles (6 km) south of the central business district of Jonesboro, a city in Jackson Parish, Louisiana, United States.

Facilities and aircraft
It has one asphalt paved runway designated 17/35 which measures 3,203 by 75 feet (976 x 23 m). For the 12-month period ending April 16, 2009, the airport had 24,000 general aviation aircraft operations, an average of 65 per day.

References

External links
 
 

Airports in Louisiana
Buildings and structures in Jackson Parish, Louisiana
Transportation in Jackson Parish, Louisiana